The Guinevere trilogy is a trilogy of historical novels written by Persia Woolley about the Arthurian legend from the first-person perspective of King Arthur's wife, Guinevere.

Historical novels
Modern Arthurian fiction
Novels set in sub-Roman Britain